Cleistocactus tominensis is a species of columnar cactus in the genus Cleistocactus, endemic to Bolivia, where it is found in forests, on cliffs, and in inter-Andean valleys at altitudes of 900 to 2,200 meters.

Subspecies
 Cleistocactus tominensis subsp. micropetalus (F.Ritter) Mottram

Synonyms
 Borzicactus tominensis (Weing.) Borg
 Borzicactus tominensis (Weing.) Neale
 Cereus tominensis Weing.
 Cleistocactus capadalensis F.Ritter
 Cleistocactus clavicaulis Cárdenas
 Cleistocactus crassicaulis Cárdenas
 Cleistocactus crassicaulis var. paucispinus F.Ritter
 Cleistocactus mendozae Cárdenas
 Cleistocactus viridialabastri Cárdenas

References
 Kaktus-ABC 190 1935.
 The Plant List entry
 IUCN Redlist entry
 ITIS Report entry

Trichocereeae
Cacti of South America
Endemic flora of Bolivia